On 16 July 1990, a mentally ill woman attacked the courtyard of the Jewish Kadimah College's primary school in Central Auckland, stabbing four children with a knife while screaming antisemitic slogans. The attack continued as other young students looked on "in horror", while members of staff ran to help the children. The woman, 52-year-old Pauline Janet Williamson, was eventually disarmed by a male teacher, Mr Yurovitch. The children, aged 6 to 8, were hospitalised immediately afterwards; all survived, after going intensive surgery. They were identified by police as 6-year-old twins Nicholas and Samuel Henderson; Simon Clark, 6, and Damon Bree, 8.

This apparently random act of antisemitic violence in New Zealand, a country known to be tolerant of its Jewish community, shocked many. However, it followed the desecration of several Jewish graves in Dunedin by two months, which itself was a copycat of an attack on Jewish graves in Carpentras, in the South of France.

Attack 
As the pupils played in the school courtyard before school was due to start on Monday, 16 July 1990, mental health outpatient Pauline Janet Williamson ran onto the school courtyard, where 6 year olds Nicholas and Sam Henderson and Simon Clark,  and 8-year-old Damon Bree were playing. She then produced a 4-inch, stay-sharp vegetable knife and began screaming antisemitic slogans and a Jewish surname (not one shared by any of the victims), before wildly lacerating these four children.

References 

Mass stabbings
Antisemitic attacks and incidents
July 1990 events in New Zealand
1990 in New Zealand
History of Auckland
Stabbing attacks in New Zealand
Stabbing attacks in 1990
Violence against children
Antisemitism in New Zealand